The  2018–19 season was the 48th season of competitive football by Universitatea Craiova. Craiova competed in the Liga I, Cupa României and Europa League.

Season overview

Background

Previous season positions

Players

Squad information

Transfers

In

Loans in

Out

Loans out

Overall transfer activity

Expenditure

Income

Net Totals

Preseason and friendlies

Competitions

Overview

Liga I

The Liga I fixture list was announced on 5 July 2018.

Regular season

Table

Results summary

Results by round

Matches

Championship round

Table

Results summary

Position by round

Matches

Cupa României

Universitatea Craiova will enter the Cupa României at the Round of 32.

Round of 32

Round of 16

Quarter-finals

Semi-finals

Supercupa României

Universitatea Craiova will play in the Romanian supercup as winners of the Cupa României.

UEFA Europa League

As winners of the 2017–18 Cupa României, Universitatea Craiova will enter the Europa League at the third qualifying round.

Third qualifying round
The draw for the third round took place on 23 July. Universitatea was drawn to play against the winners from the second qualifying round match between RB Leipzig and Häcken. Universitatea Craiova will play on 9 August and on 16 August 2018. On 2 August, RB Leipzig was confirmed as Craiova's opponent after their 5–1 aggregate win over Häcken.

Statistics

Appearances and goals

|-
|}

Squad statistics
{|class="wikitable" style="text-align: center;"
|-
! 
! style="width:70px;"|Liga I
! style="width:70px;"|Cupa României
! style="width:70px;"|Supercupa României
! style="width:70px;"|Europa League
! style="width:70px;"|Home
! style="width:70px;"|Away
! style="width:70px;"|Total Stats
|-
|align=left|Games played       || 0 || 0 || 0 || 0 || 0 || 0 || 0
|-
|align=left|Games won          || 0 || 0 || 0 || 0 || 0 || 0 || 0
|-
|align=left|Games drawn        || 0 || 0 || 0 || 0 || 0 || 0 || 0
|-
|align=left|Games lost         || 0 || 0 || 0 || 0 || 0 || 0 || 0
|-
|align=left|Goals scored       || 0 || 0 || 0 || 0 || 0 || 0 || 0
|-
|align=left|Goals conceded     || 0 || 0 || 0 || 0 || 0 || 0 || 0
|-
|align=left|Goal difference    || 0 || 0 || 0 || 0 || 0 || 0 || 0
|-
|align=left|Clean sheets       || 0 || 0 || 0 || 0 || 0 || 0 || 0
|-
|align=left|Goal by Substitute || 0 || 0 || 0 || 0 || 0 || 0 || 0
|-
|align=left|Total shots        || – || – || – || – || – || – || –
|-
|align=left|Shots on target    || – || – || – || – || – || – || –
|-
|align=left|Corners            || – || – || – || – || – || – || –
|-
|align=left|Players used       || – || – || – || – || – || – || –
|-
|align=left|Offsides           || – || – || – || – || – || – || –
|-
|align=left|Fouls suffered     || – || – || – || – || – || –|| –
|-
|align=left|Fouls committed    || – || – || – || – || – || – || –
|-
|align=left|Yellow cards       || 0 || 0 || 0 || 0 || 0 || 0 || 0
|-
|align=left|Red cards          || 0 || 0 || 0 || 0 || 0 || 0 || 0
|-
|align=left| Winning rate      || 0% || 0% || 0% || 0% || 0% || 0% || 0%
|-

Goalscorers

Last updated: 1 July 2018

Goal minutes

Last updated: 2018 (UTC) 
Source: UCV1948

Hat-tricks

Clean sheets

Disciplinary record

Includes all competitive matches. Players listed below made at least one appearance for Universitatea Craiova first squad during the season.

Attendances

See also

 2018–19 Cupa României
 2018–19 Liga I
 2018–19 UEFA Europa League

References

CS Universitatea Craiova seasons
Universitatea, Craiova, CS
Universitatea Craiova